The 1970 Ballon d'Or,  given to the best football player in Europe as judged by a panel of sports journalists from UEFA member countries, was awarded to the West German forward Gerd Müller on 29 December 1970. There were 26 voters, from Austria, Belgium, Bulgaria, Czechoslovakia, Denmark, East Germany, England, Finland, France, Greece, Hungary, Italy, Luxembourg, the Netherlands, Norway, Poland, Portugal, Republic of Ireland, Romania, Soviet Union, Spain, Sweden, Switzerland, Turkey, West Germany and Yugoslavia. Müller became the first West German national and the first Bayern Munich player to win the Ballon d'Or.

Rankings

References

External links
 France Football Official Ballon d'Or page

1970
1970–71 in European football